is a Japanese manga artist. At times he is billed as "Atsushi Kamijo and Yoko", which refers to Yoko Murase, his assistant. Kamijo is known for his stylish designs, which often use pure white backgrounds with very little middle ground between black and white. Atsushi made his debut in a special issue of Shonen Sunday in 1983 with the story "Mob Hunter".

His past assistants include Katsutoshi Kawai and Makoto Ito. He has also produced advertisements and CD album covers.

Works
 
 
 
 
 
 
 
 Zingy (written by Tetsu Kariya)
 
 
 To-y
 
  (To-Y spin-off)
  (To-Y spin-off)
 
 
 Giraffer Boy
 
 
 Let It Roll
 Flowers of Romance
 
 Sex
 
 After Sex

Anime
 Endless Night short film – Character designer
 Space Dandy – Character designer for Johnny – Ep. 20

References

External links
 Lambiek Comiclopedia article
 To-Y
 Private Pride
 Atsushi Kamijo manga works at Media Arts Database

1963 births
Living people
Manga artists from Tokyo
People from Tokyo
Album-cover and concert-poster artists
Advertising artists and illustrators